Austrogomphus ochraceus, also known as Austrogomphus (Austrogomphus) ochraceus, is a species of dragonfly in the family Gomphidae, 
commonly known as the jade hunter. 
It inhabits streams, rivers and lakes in eastern Australia from north of Brisbane through New South Wales to Victoria.

Austrogomphus ochraceus is a tiny to medium-sized, black and yellow dragonfly.

Gallery

See also
 List of Odonata species of Australia

References

Gomphidae
Odonata of Australia
Insects of Australia
Endemic fauna of Australia
Taxa named by Edmond de Sélys Longchamps
Insects described in 1869